Abdollahabad (also Romanized as ‘Abdollāhābād) is a village in Howmeh Rural District, in the Central District of Damghan County, Semnan Province, Iran. At the 2006 census, its population was 22, in 6 families.

References 

Populated places in Damghan County